Piacenza Calcio managed to secure a penultimate-round survival in their second attempt to establish themselves in Serie A. Much thanks to the presence of 14-times goal scorer Nicola Caccia and creative midfielder Gianpietro Piovani, plus a tight defensive line, Piacenza had five points in hand to the relegated Bari.

Squad

Goalkeepers
  Luigi Simoni
  Massimo Taibi

Defenders
  Cleto Polonia
  Settimio Lucci
  Stefano Maccoppi
  Stefano Rossini
  Mirko Conte
  Roberto Lorenzini
  Massimo Brioschi
  Simone Corradi
  Cristian Trapella

Midfielders
  Eusebio Di Francesco
  Eugenio Corini
  Angelo Carbone
  Francesco Turrini
  Daniele Moretti
  Gianpietro Piovani

Attackers
  Nicola Caccia
  Massimiliano Cappellini
  Gabriele Ballotta

Serie A

Matches

Top scorers
  Nicola Caccia 14
  Gianpietro Piovani 8
  Eusebio Di Francesco 2
  Angelo Carbone 2
  Massimiliano Cappellini 2

References

Sources
  RSSSF - Italy 1995/96

Piacenza Calcio 1919 seasons
Piacenza